Harald Theissen (born 23 March 1959) is a former professional tennis player from Germany.

Career
Theissen competed in the 1982 Australian Open and won a five set match over Lloyd Bourne in the opening round of the singles draw, before losing in the second round to Mike Bauer. In the men's doubles he and partner Damir Keretić lost in the first round to Peter Johnston and John McCurdy.

References

1959 births
Living people
People from Troisdorf
Sportspeople from Cologne (region)
German male tennis players
West German male tennis players
Tennis people from North Rhine-Westphalia